Meenakshisundaram Ramasamy Krishnamurthy better known as Kishmu was an Indian film and stage actor. He is also brother of famous actor and director Visu. Kishmu made his debut in the Visu-directed film Manal Kayiru in 1982. Other notable film appearances include Manal Kayiru, Dowry Kalyanam, Chidambara Rahasiyam, Samsaram Adhu Minsaaram, Thirumathi Oru Vegumathi,
 Nanayam illatha Nanayam, 
Kavalan Avan Kovalan, and Varavu Nalla Uravu.

Film career 
After his career in theatre, Kishmu began acting with his brother, Visu. Kishmu made his acting debut in the second film directed by Visu, Manal Kayiru (1982), which received critical and commercial acclaim. In 1985, Kishmu acted in Aval Sumangalithan, and in 1986 played the role of protagonist in Samsaram Adhu Minsaram and Oomai Vizhigal, which both received positive reviews. In his early acting career, Kishmu acted only in his brother's films, but eventually went on to act in others, performing in over 50 films from 1982 to 1990.

Filmography 
This is a partial filmography. You can expand it.

 As assistant director
Sakalakala Sammandhi (1989)

References

External links 

Indian male film actors
Male actors in Tamil cinema
Tamil male actors
1947 births
1993 deaths